This was the first edition of the tournament.

Timofey Skatov won the title after defeating Jozef Kovalík 7–5, 6–7(2–7), 6–4 in the final.

Seeds

Draw

Finals

Top half

Bottom half

References

External links
Main draw
Qualifying draw

Parma Challenger - 1